Silke Frankl (born 29 May 1970) is a former professional tennis player from Germany.

Biography
Born in Mannheim, Frankl began competing on the WTA Tour in 1988.

Her only WTA Tour final came in doubles, at the 1988 Athens Trophy.

Frankl broke into the top 100 of the singles rankings for the first time in 1993 and made the third round of the 1993 French Open.

In 1994 she reached her best ranking of 67, with her performances including making the semi-finals at the Prague Open, a win over 14th seed Zina Garrison at the French Open and a third round appearance at Wimbledon.

She retired from professional tennis in 1998 but continued to play in the Bundesliga for several years with TK Grün-Weiss Mannheim.

WTA Tour finals

Doubles (0–1)

ITF finals

Singles (2–6)

Doubles (1–2)

References

External links
 
 

1970 births
Living people
German female tennis players
West German female tennis players
Sportspeople from Mannheim
Tennis people from Baden-Württemberg